Horton Smith (May 22, 1908 – October 15, 1963) was an American professional golfer, best known as the winner of the first and third Masters Tournaments.

Tournament career 
Born in Springfield, Missouri, Smith turned professional in 1926 and won his first tournament, the Oklahoma City Open in 1928. In 1929 he won eight titles. This was an era of expansion and reorganization for professional golf. The PGA Tour was founded in 1934, and Smith was one of the leading players of the early years of the tour, topping the money list in 1936. He accumulated 30 PGA Tour titles in total, the last of them in 1941, and his two major championships came at the Masters, at the inaugural tournament in 1934 and again in 1936.

Smith was a member of five Ryder Cup teams: 1929, 1931, 1933, 1935, and 1937. Smith was the only golfer to defeat Bobby Jones during the latter's Grand Slam year of 1930, at the stroke play Savannah Open in February. He played in every Masters through 1963, the year of his death.

Post-playing career
Smith served in the U.S. Army Air Forces during World War II in the special services division coordinating athletics and was discharged as a captain.

After the war, he became the club pro at Detroit Golf Club in Michigan in 1946, where he remained until his death. He was president of the PGA of America from 1952 to 1954. During that time black professionals continued to be excluded from PGA events despite Smith stating that he would support reviewing this rule when, in January 1952, Bill Spiller was excluded from the San Diego Open while former boxer Joe Louis was allowed to play as an invited amateur. The "Caucasian only" clause in the PGA of America's constitution was not amended until November 1961.

When he resigned as head professional of Oak Park Country Club in 1936, his elder brother Renshaw (1906–1971) replaced him at the club in River Grove, Illinois.

Death
Smith died in 1963 at age 55 of Hodgkin's disease in Detroit. He had lost a lung to cancer six years earlier, and is buried in his hometown of Springfield, Missouri. He was the first of the former Masters champions to pass away, followed by Craig Wood in 1968 and Jimmy Demaret in 1983.

Awards and honors 
Smith was inducted into the Michigan Golf Hall of Fame in 1984.
Smith was inducted into the World Golf Hall of Fame in 1990.
In 1960, awarded the Ben Hogan Award by the golf writers for overcoming a physical handicap and continued active participation in golf.
In 1962, he was voted the Bob Jones Award, the highest honor given by the United States Golf Association in recognition of distinguished sportsmanship in golf.
The PGA of America bestowed the Horton Smith Award, presented annually since 1965, to a PGA professional who has made "outstanding and continuing contributions to PGA education." On July 2, 2020, it was renamed the PGA Professional Development Award by the board of directors because Smith had been a supporter of the PGA's "Caucasian-only' membership clause that was part of their by-laws from 1934 to 1961.
A municipal golf course in his hometown of Springfield, Missouri, is named for him.
A golf tournament at the Detroit Golf Club is named for him.
He is attributed with being the first professional golfer to study putting as a means to beat his opponents.
In September 2013, Horton's green jacket, awarded in 1949 for his Masters wins in 1934 and 1936, sold at auction for over $682,000; the highest price ever paid for a piece of golf memorabilia. It had been in the possession of his brother Ren's stepsons for decades.

Professional wins

PGA Tour wins (30) 
1928 (2) Oklahoma City Open, Catalina Island Open
1929 (8) Berkeley Open Championship, Pensacola Open Invitational, Florida Open, La Gorce Open, Fort Myers Open, North and South Open, Oregon Open, Pasadena Open (December)
1930 (4) Central Florida Open, Savannah Open, Berkeley Open, Bay District Open
1931 (1) St. Paul Open
1932 (1) National Capital City Open
1933 (1) Miami International Four-Ball (with Paul Runyan)
1934 (3) Masters Tournament, Grand Slam Open, California Open
1935 (3) Palm Springs Invitational, Miami Biltmore Open, Pasadena Open
1936 (2) Masters Tournament, Victoria Open
1937 (3) North and South Open, Inverness Invitational Four-Ball (with Harry Cooper), Oklahoma Four-Ball (with Harry Cooper)
1941 (2) Florida West Coast Open, St. Paul Open

Major championships are shown in bold.

Source:

Other wins
this list is probably incomplete
1929 French PGA Championship
1940 Massachusetts Open
1948 Michigan PGA Championship
1954 Michigan Open

Major championships

Wins (2)

Results timeline

NYF = tournament not yet founded
NT = no tournament
WD = withdrew
CUT = missed the half-way cut
R64, R32, R16, QF, SF = Round in which player lost in PGA Championship match play
"T" indicates a tie for a place

Summary

Most consecutive cuts made – 43 (1927 U.S. Open – 1946 Masters)
Longest streak of top-10s – 3 (twice)

See also
List of golfers with most PGA Tour wins
Most PGA Tour wins in a year

References

External links

PGA of America Hall of Fame

American male golfers
PGA Tour golfers
Ryder Cup competitors for the United States
Winners of men's major golf championships
World Golf Hall of Fame inductees
Golfers from Missouri
Golfers from Detroit
Sportspeople from Springfield, Missouri
Deaths from cancer in Michigan
Deaths from Hodgkin lymphoma
Burials at Springfield National Cemetery
1908 births
1963 deaths